'Crobot' is the eponymous extended play by the Pennsylvanian hard rock band, Crobot. It was released through Wind-up Records on May 13, 2014, ahead of their first album Something Supernatural.

Track listing
"Legend of the Spaceborne Killer" – 3:17
"Nowhere to Hide" – 3:03
"La Mano de Lucifer" – 5:34
"Skull of Geronimo" –3:56

References 

Crobot albums
2014 EPs